Joseph Charles Whitworth (born 29 February 2004) is an English professional footballer who plays as a goalkeeper for Crystal Palace.

Club career
Initially on the books of AFC Wimbledon, Whitworth moved to the youth academy of Crystal Palace in 2016. In January 2023, he signed a contract extension with Crystal Palace, after working his way up through their youth teams. He made his senior debut with Crystal Palace in a Premier League match against Brighton & Hove Albion on 15 March 2023. In doing so, he became their youngest ever goalkeeper in the Premier League and 5th-youngest in all competitions.

International career
Whitworth is a youth international for England, having played up to the England U18s, and has had a call-up to the Under 19s.

Career statistics

References

External links
 
 

2004 births
Living people
English footballers
England youth international footballers
Association football goalkeepers
Crystal Palace F.C. players
Premier League players